Camberwell Green is  of common land in Camberwell, south London laid out as a formal park.  Its south-west corner is the junction of Camberwell Road/Denmark Hill and Camberwell New Road/Camberwell Church Street. Its other edges share one point of motor vehicle access. Behind a library at the north-east of the Green is the former Camberwell Magistrate's Court, and at the north-west is a home for the elderly. To the south-west, and overlooking the Green, is a parade of shops including banks and restaurants. The Green is recorded in surveys and accounts of the manor of Camberwell and vestry of Southwark as common land, meaning owned by the lord of the manor but subject to grazing and other rights of local residents. It was bought by Camberwell Parish Vestry in the late 19th century to protect it from development. Camberwell Green is also the name of the London Borough of Southwark electoral ward around the Green.

See also
Camberwell
"Camberwell Green" or No. 6 Allegretto grazioso in A major by Felix Mendelssohn

External links
London Parks
Camberwell Guide
Camberwell Green makeover

Parks and open spaces in the London Borough of Southwark
Road junctions in London
Camberwell